Carmel Moravian Church sits dramatically atop a hill  west of the small market town of Newmarket in Westmoreland, Jamaica. It was founded in 1827 at the behest of a local family of planters who wished to teach Christianity to their slaves.

History
Planters Mr. and Mrs. Hutchinson Muir Scott owned properties in the area and starting in 1818 made several attempts to find a Christian minister for their slaves.

Eventually, c1820, they invited Moravian missionaries to begin regular services on their estates.

A hill top site was chosen by the Scotts in 1826 and a road built up to the temporary building they had constructed there.

John Scholefield was appointed as the first minister of Carmel in 1827 and oversaw work on a new church which started the same year and was completed in 1828. It was soon found to be too small and as a result services had to be held both morning and evening to satisfy the demand.

Buildings

Church
A cut stone and mortar structure with a large masonry belfry to the south topped by a wooden cupola and containing one bell.

A pipe organ was obtained from Germany circa 1895.

Manse
A 20th-century building of rendered breeze blocks with a zinc roof. Rain water was channeled by gutters from the roof to a large storage tank to the south of the building from where it was daily pumped by hand into a header tank of old oil drums and gravity fed to taps.

School
There is an infant school a little downhill to the west of the church, opposite the main entrance.

Burial ground
Running downhill to the north of the church is a small and sparsely used God's Acre of about 1,700m2.

Ministers

Notable members

Archibald Monteith, an ex-slave who was called 'Aneaso' born in Africa, and brought to Jamaica and later wrote an autobiography.

References

Bibliography

Congregations of Jamaica Province of the Moravian Church
Moravian churches in Jamaica
1827 establishments in the British Empire
Churches completed in 1828